Aechmea mariae-reginae is a species in the genus Aechmea. endemic to Central America (Costa Rica, Nicaragua, Honduras). This is one of the few Bromelioideae species that is dioecious, and is the only species in its genus with this trait.

Cultivars
Cultivars include:

 Aechmea 'Jimmie Knight'
 Aechmea 'Maygood Moir'
 Aechmea 'Prince Albert'
 × Androlaechmea 'Dean'

References

mariae-reginae
Flora of Central America
Plants described in 1863
Dioecious plants